is a Japanese publishing company founded on July 10, 1950. It is based in Bunkyo-ku, Tokyo.

Magazines published by Houbunsha
Weekly Manga Times
Hana Oto
Comic Fuz

Manga Time magazines
Manga Time
Manga Time Original
Manga Home

Manga Time Kirara magazines
Manga Time Kirara
Manga Time Kirara Carat
Manga Time Kirara Forward
Manga Time Kirara Magica - A dedicated Puella Magi Madoka Magica magazine (irregular publication)
Manga Time Kirara Max

Discontinued magazines
Tsubomi (2009-2012)
Manga Time Jumbo (1985-2018)
Manga Time Lovely (1994-2011)
Manga Time Family (1984-2018)
Manga Time Kirara Miracle! (2011-2017)
Manga Time Special (1989-2019)
Manga Time Dash!
Manga Time Pop (2002-2003)
Manga Time Kitsch! (1994-discontinued)

Manga
 Only Serious About You (2010)
 Pleasure Dome (2000)

References

External links
  

Japanese companies established in 1950
Book publishing companies in Tokyo
Comic book publishing companies in Tokyo
 
Magazine publishing companies in Tokyo
Manga distributors
Publishing companies established in 1950